Pubigera is a genus of fungi within the Hyaloscyphaceae family. This is a monotypic genus, containing the single species Pubigera subvillosula.

References

External links
Pubigera at Index Fungorum

Hyaloscyphaceae
Monotypic Leotiomycetes genera